[TO]Bike is the bicycle sharing system of the city of Turin. Planned between 2008 and 2009, it became operational in the summer of 2010.

Service
The service is operational 24 hours a day every day of the year. It is based on the Bicincittà system: every station is formed from 8 to 20 terminals (or more). Each terminal consists in a small metallic column with an RFID reader interface on top. This includes two LEDs: a green one for normal operation ad a red one to indicate malfunction or errors while reading users' cards. A complementary piezo speaker acts with the LEDs to indicate the correct or incorrect reading of the user's code.

The user approaches his personal card to the terminal, which in normal conditions mechanically releases the bike. From that moment the bike released is available for a period of 30 minutes. All the terminals are connected together to create a network which allows the user and service administration to locate the stations where the bike has been withdrawn (every bike is equipped with its own RFID chip). The service is completed by a web platform, from which the user can check his credit, renew the subscription and keep track of all the trips made and the number of bikes used. An operator service through a free telephone number is also available 24 hours a day.

The system is also linked with the BiciInComune services, operational in the near cities of Alpignano, Druento, Rivoli, Collegno, Grugliasco and Venaria Reale all operated with the Bicincittà technology too. In this way, you can catch a bike in the center of Turin and put down in every station of that cities.

Bikes
The bikes adopted by the ToBike services are low-profile women's model citybikes.  The livery is inspired by the official colors of the city with yellow main frame and blue large stickers for the ToBike logo .  Equipment includes a 7-speed chain transmission, front and rear lights powered by a dynamo installed on the front wheel hub, and a metallic basket on the handlebar and a bell. On the left side of the junction between the handlebar and frame is the cylindrical locking joint that contains the identifying RFID chip and allows locking it to the terminal. The wheels are made of aluminum alloy on which reinforced tires are mounted.

Rates
The annual cost of the service is of €25, with a preventive €5 addition in order to create a credit on the user's account. In case the user exceeds from the 30' canonic time for a single use of a bike, the service will apply fines and automatically scale sums from that credit. A €5 global insurance against damages to third parties is also offered optionally. The offer also includes daily and weekly subscriptions.

Stations and further development
ToBike system consists of a growing number of bikes and 176 stations among operational, under construction ones and planned ones. Joining the 28 stations of Alpignano, Druento, Rivoli, Collegno, Grugliasco and Venaria Reale the number of stations reaches 204. Anyway, nowadays (November 2013) in Turin only 100 station are operational; the others 76 are still under study and development.

See also 
 List of bicycle-sharing systems

Notes and references

External links 
 

Community bicycle programs
Transport in Turin
Bicycle sharing in Italy